Predel is a small settlement in the Municipality of Šmarje pri Jelšah in eastern Slovenia. It lies just south of the regional road from Šmarje towards Grobelno in the historical Styria region. The municipality is now included in the Savinja Statistical Region.

References

External links
Predel at Geopedia

Populated places in the Municipality of Šmarje pri Jelšah